Dawnsong is a public artwork by American artist Brose Partington, located at Indianapolis Art Center in Indianapolis, Indiana, United States. Dawnsong was installed as part of the Center's ARTSPARK initiative.

Description
Dawnsong is a kinetic sculpture that serves as an interactive bike rack. A steel obelisk with a hand-crank on it juts upwards with a birdhouse resting on the top. The aluminum bird house has multiple holes throughout its multiple "stories." When the hand-crank is turned the house expands and contracts slightly. The sculpture is placed at the Efroymson Canoe Launch area along the White River near the Monon Trail.

Acquisition
This piece was placed in conjunction with the Center's ARTSPARK which brings together art and nature. Partington worked alongside the City of Indianapolis to plan this work of art.

Information
This sculpture is representative of the artist's interest in urban sprawl. According to Partington: "In Dawnsong, I am taking the multioccupancy home and through a series of gears and a hand-crank allowing the viewer to transform it into a single, more suburban home. Through this cyclical pattern, it creates the effect of a developing or dissolving community."

See also
Entangled

References

External links
Brose Partington webpage for Dawnsong

Bicycle parking
Shelters built or used by animals
Indianapolis Art Center artworks
Urbanization
Outdoor sculptures in Indianapolis
Aluminum sculptures in Indiana
2008 sculptures
2008 establishments in Indiana
Kinetic sculptures in the United States
Interactive art
Steel sculptures in Indiana